Sport Fishin': The Lure of the Bait, The Luck of the Hook is the second album by Canadian surf rock group Shadowy Men on a Shadowy Planet, released in 1993 through Cargo Records. It was recorded by Steve Albini.

The album was reissued in 2016, with bonus tracks recorded with Fred Schneider.

Critical reception
Trouser Press called the album "incrementally more diverse in its creative ambitions" than the band's previous releases. The Encyclopedia of Popular Music deemed it "excellent" and "a lean and dirty-sounding record."

Track listing

Personnel 
Shadowy Men on a Shadowy Planet
Brian Connelly – guitar, keyboards
Reid Diamond – bass guitar
Don Pyle – drums
Production and additional personnel
Steve Albini – recording
Ormond Jobin – recording on "Spend a Night, Not a Fortune" and "Honey You're Wasting Ammo"

References

External links 
 

1993 albums
Shadowy Men on a Shadowy Planet albums
Cargo Records (Canada) albums